Charles Moïse Briquet (30 August 1839, in Geneva – 24 January 1918, in Geneva) was a noted Swiss filigranologist. He was the first, or among the first, to suggest the use of watermarks for dating paper. He produced in 1907 the mammoth four-volume work Les Filigranes. His papers, including his collection of traced watermarks, are kept at the Bibliothèque de Genève.

Works by Briquet that have been published in English 
 "The Briquet Album : a miscellany on watermarks, supplementing Dr. Briquet's "Les filigranes", (1952).
 "Briquet's Opuscula; the complete works of Dr. C.M. Briquet without Les filigranes", (1955).

References

Watermarking
1839 births
1918 deaths
19th-century Swiss historians
Swiss male writers
Scientists from Geneva